Oana Jurchescu is a Romanian physicist who is the Baker Family Physics Professor at Wake Forest University. Her research considers charge transport in organic and organic/inorganic hybrid semiconductors. In 2022, she was awarded a National Science Foundation Special Creativity Award for her work translating organic electronic materials into real-world devices.

Early life and education 
Jurchescu was an undergraduate student at the West University of Timișoara in Romania. She moved to the University of Groningen in the Netherlands for her doctoral research, where she studied organic semiconductors for optoelectronic devices. She was a postdoctoral researcher at the National Institute of Standards and Technology.

Research and career 
In 2009, Jurchescu joined the Department of Physics at Wake Forest University. Her work considers novel functional materials and their application in electronic devices. She has particularly explored organic and hybrid organic-inorganic semiconductors and how they can realize large-area, flexible electronic devices.

Jurchescu worked with physicians to realize organic field-effect transistor- based radiation detectors for patients undergoing cancer treatment. These devices, based on 2,8-difluoro-5,11-bis(triethylsilylethynyl)anthradithiophene (diF-TES ADT), acted as in vivo dosimeters to monitor radiation levels on a patient's skin in real time. As well as pursuing high charge carrier mobilities, Jurchescu is interested in the degradation pathways that can impede the performance and lifetime of organic electronic devices.

Jurcheschu was named Baker Family Professor of Physics in 2021. In 2022, she was awarded an NSF Special Creativity Award to develop OSCAR, Organic Semiconductors by Computation on the Accelerated Refinement. OSCAR look to develop novel functional molecular materials to accelerate commercialization.

Awards and honors 
 2012 Wake Forest University Faculty Endowment Fund Fellowship
 2013 Wake Forest University Reid-Doyle Prize for Excellence in Teaching
 2013 National Science Foundation CAREER Award
 2013 Wake Forest University Innovation Award
 2014 Journal of Materials Chemistry C  Emerging Investigators Issue
 2015 Wake Forest University Award for Excellence in Research
 2017 Kulynych Family Omicron Delta Kappa Award
 2018 URECA Award For Excellence in Mentorship in Research and Creative Work
 2020 Graduate School Student Association Faculty Excellence Award

Selected publications

References 

Living people
Wake Forest University faculty
Year of birth missing (living people)
University of Groningen alumni
West University of Timișoara alumni
21st-century physicists
Romanian women physicists